State Route 108 (SR 108) is a primary state highway in the U.S. state of Virginia.  Known as Figsboro Road, the state highway runs  from SR 174 near Collinsville north to SR 657 and SR 890 at Figsboro.

Route description

SR 108 begins at an acute intersection with SR 174 (Kings Mountain Road) east of Collinsville and north of Martinsville.  The state highway heads north as a two-lane undivided road through northern Henry County.  SR 108 reaches its northern terminus at its intersection with SR 657 (Old Quarry Road) at Figsboro.  Figsboro Road continues north as SR 890 toward SR 40 at Penhook in southern Franklin County.

Major intersections

References

External links

Virginia Highways Project: VA 108

108
State Route 108